William Otis "Otey" Clark (May 22, 1915 – October 20, 2010) was a Major League Baseball pitcher who played for the Boston Red Sox in 1945. He was born in Boscobel, Wisconsin. The 29-year-old rookie stood 6-foot  inches and weighed 190 pounds.

Clark is one of many ballplayers who only appeared in the major leagues during World War II.  He made his major league debut on April 17, 1945, (Opening Day), pitching in relief against the New York Yankees at Yankee Stadium.  His finest pitching effort that season came on September 19 in the second game of a doubleheader at Fenway Park.  He hurled a complete game shutout against the Philadelphia Athletics, winning by a score of 3–0.

Clark also defeated Bob Feller in the 1945 season, in Feller's first game back in baseball following World War II.

Season and career totals include a record of 4–4 in 12 games pitched, nine games started, four complete games, one shutout, three games finished and an ERA of 3.07 in 82 innings pitched.  He struck out 20 and walked 19.  Also good with the bat and glove, Clark hit .208 (5-for-24) and handled 11 chances in the field without an error.

One day before appearing in the 1945 season opener, Clark pitched to Jackie Robinson in the latter's tryout for the Boston Red Sox.

At the time of his death in Boscobel, Wisconsin, on October 20, 2010, he was considered one of the oldest living former MLB players.

References

External links
Baseball Reference
Retrosheet

1915 births
2010 deaths
People from Boscobel, Wisconsin
Major League Baseball pitchers
Baseball players from Wisconsin
Boston Red Sox players
Burials in Wisconsin
Columbus Red Birds players
Eau Claire Bears players
Fort Worth Cats players
Louisville Colonels (minor league) players
Minneapolis Millers (baseball) players
Moline Plow Boys players
Scranton Miners players
Tarboro Tars players
Toledo Mud Hens players